Cape Hattersley-Smith is a cape marked by a triangular rock peak at the southeast end of Condor Peninsula,  southwest of Cape Knowles, on the Black Coast of Palmer Land, Antarctica. The cape was photographed from the air by the United States Antarctic Service on December 30, 1940. It was surveyed by the Falkland Islands Dependencies Survey (FIDS)–Ronne Antarctic Research Expedition party from Stonington Island in November 1947 and was rephotographed by the U.S. Navy in 1966.

The cape was named by the Advisory Committee on Antarctic Names in 1984 after the British geologist Geoffrey Francis Hattersley-Smith.  Hattersley-Smith was FIDS base leader and glaciologist at Admiralty Bay, South Shetland Islands, 1948–49. In the period 1951–73 he was with the Defense Research Board of Canada doing field research in the Arctic. From 1973 he was with the British Antarctic Survey, and was Secretary of the UK Antarctic Place-Names Committee, 1975–91. Hattersley-Smith was the author of The History of Place-names in the Falkland Islands Dependencies (South Georgia and the South Sandwich Islands), Cambridge, 1980, and The History of Place-names in the British Antarctic Territory, Cambridge, 1991.

References

Headlands of Palmer Land